This is a complete list of four-star generals in the United States Marine Corps. The rank of general (or full general, or four-star general) is the highest rank in the Marine Corps. It ranks above lieutenant general (three-star general).

There have been 74 four-star generals in the history of the United States Marine Corps. Of these, 56 achieved that rank while on active duty, 17 were promoted upon retirement in recognition of combat citations ("tombstone promotions", 1942–1959), and one was promoted posthumously. Generals entered the Marine Corps via several paths: 29 via Officer Candidates School (OCS), 25 via Naval Reserve Officer Training Corps (NROTC) at a civilian university, 10 via the United States Naval Academy (USNA), 3 via Reserve Officers' Training Corps (ROTC) at a civilian university, and 7 via ROTC at a senior military college.

List of generals
Entries in the following list of four-star generals are indexed by the numerical order in which each officer was promoted to that rank while on active duty, or by an asterisk (*) if the officer did not serve in that rank while on active duty. Each entry lists the general's name, date of rank, active-duty positions held while serving at four-star rank, number of years of active-duty service at four-star rank (Yrs), year commissioned and source of commission, number of years in commission when promoted to four-star rank (YC), and other biographical notes.

Tombstone generals
The Act of Congress of March 4, 1925, allowed officers in the Navy, Marine Corps, and Coast Guard to be promoted one grade upon retirement if they had been specially commended for performance of duty in actual combat. Combat citation promotions were colloquially known as "tombstone promotions" because they conferred all the perks and prestige of the higher rank including the loftier title on their tombstones but no additional retirement pay. The Act of Congress of February 23, 1942, enabled tombstone promotions to three- and four-star grades. Tombstone promotions were subsequently restricted to citations issued before January 1, 1947, and finally eliminated altogether effective November 1, 1959.  The practice was terminated in an effort to encourage senior officer retirements prior to the effective date of the change to relieve an overstrength in the senior ranks.

Any general who actually served in a grade while on active duty receives precedence on the retirement list over any tombstone general holding the same retired grade. Tombstone generals rank among each other according to the dates of their highest active duty grade.

History

Four-star positions

1945–present

By the Act of March 21, 1945, Congress permitted the President to appoint the Commandant of the Marine Corps to the grade of general. Alexander Vandegrift, then Commandant, was promoted from lieutenant general to general on April 4, 1945, to rank from March 21 of that year. He thus became the first Marine to serve in the grade of general. The Office of the Commandant was permanently fixed at the grade of four-star general under authority of the Act of August 7, 1947.

In April 1969, the Senate passed and sent a bill to the White House that makes the Assistant Commandant of the Marine Corps a four-star general when the active duty strength of the Marine Corps exceeds 200,000. On May 5, 1969, President Richard Nixon signed the bill, and Lieutenant General Lewis William Walt was promoted to that rank on June 2, 1969, thus becoming the first Assistant Commandant of the Marine Corps to attain four-star rank. Legislation allowing the Assistant Commandant to wear the four-star insignia regardless of the strength of the Marine Corps was approved by President Gerald Ford on March 4, 1976.

On November 22, 1985, General George B. Crist was promoted to four-star rank and on November 27, he assumed the position of Commander in Chief of U.S. Central Command at MacDill Air Force Base, Florida. His appointment marked the first time a Marine headed a unified command and the first time the Corps had three four-star generals on active duty at the same time. Since 1985, a number of Marines have served in joint positions holding four-star rank, and it is no longer uncommon for the Corps to have four or five four-star generals on active duty at the same time.

In 2005, General Peter Pace became the first Marine to be appointed as Chairman of the Joint Chiefs of Staff, the chief military advisor to the President of the United States and most senior appointment in the United States armed forces. Previously, in 2001, General Pace was the first Marine officer to be appointed as Vice Chairman of the Joint Chiefs of Staff (VJCS).

The standard tour length for the commandant (CMC) is four years; two years for the assistant commandant (ACMC); for a combatant commander, three years; and a total of four years served in consecutive two-year terms for the chairman and vice chairman of the Joint Chiefs of Staff (CJCS/VJCS).

See also

 General (United States)
 List of active duty United States four-star officers
 List of United States Army four-star generals
 List of United States Navy four-star admirals
 List of United States Air Force four-star generals
 List of United States Space Force four-star generals
 List of United States Coast Guard four-star admirals
 List of United States Public Health Service Commissioned Corps four-star admirals
 List of United States military leaders by rank
 List of United States Marine Corps lieutenant generals on active duty before 1960
 List of United States Marine Corps lieutenant generals since 2010

References

Bibliography

Four-star officers
Marine Corps four-star generals
Lists of generals
Four-star generals